Hot shrinking is a process in car bodyworks. As the name suggests, heat will be involved, while "shrinking" is the process of straightening a metal section. This is a method of panel beating where a panel is first heated to make it softer. In most cases heating will be done by use of the oxyacetylene flame.

Hot shrinking process
Locate the highest point of the panel, light the torch and heat the spot to a cherry red. Strike the area using a mallet around the heat spot. After several blows the sop will turn black, quench it immediately with a damp cloth. Repeat the process around the heated spot until the stretched part became fully shrinked.

See also 
Cold shrinking - a longer but similar process

References 

Motor vehicle maintenance
Automotive terminology